Mohammad Daoud Anwary (born 8 March 1942) is an Afghan retired wrestler, who competed at the 1964 Summer Olympics in the bantamweight freestyle event.

References

External links

Wrestlers at the 1964 Summer Olympics
Afghan male sport wrestlers
Olympic wrestlers of Afghanistan
1942 births
Living people
Place of birth missing (living people)
20th-century Afghan people